A trans woman or a transgender woman is a woman who was assigned male at birth. Trans women have a female gender identity and may experience gender dysphoria, distress brought upon by the discrepancy between their gender identity and sex assigned at birth. Gender dysphoria may be treated with gender-affirming care.

Gender-affirming care may include social or medical transition. A major component of medical transition for trans women is feminizing hormone therapy, which causes the development of female secondary sex characteristics (breasts, redistribution of body fat, lower waist–hip ratio, etc.). This, along with socially transitioning, and receiving desired gender-affirming surgeries can relieve the person of gender dysphoria. Like cisgender women, trans women may have any sexual orientation.

Trans women face significant discrimination in many areas of life—including in employment and access to housing—and face physical and sexual violence and hate crimes, including from partners. In the United States, discrimination is particularly severe towards trans women who are members of a racial minority, who often face the intersection of transphobia and racism.

The term transgender woman is not always interchangeable with transsexual woman, although the terms are often used interchangeably. Transgender is an umbrella term that includes different types of gender variant people (including transsexual people).

Terminology
Transgender (commonly abbreviated as trans) is an umbrella term for people whose gender identity or gender expression are different from those typically associated with members of the sex they were assigned at birth. Transgender women, sometimes called male-to-female (MtF), are those who were assigned the male sex at birth (AMAB), but who identify and live as women.

Trans woman may also be short for transsexual woman. Transsexual is a subset of transgender, referring to people who desire to medically transition to the sex with which they identify, usually through sex reassignment therapies, such as hormone replacement therapy and sex reassignment surgery, to align their body with their identified sex or gender. The term is rejected by some as outdated, though others within the trans community still identify as transsexual. 

Transfeminine (or ) is a broader umbrella term for assigned-male trans individuals with a predominantly feminine identity or gender expression. This includes trans women, but is used especially for AMAB non-binary people, who may have an identity that is partially feminine, but not wholly female.

The spelling  (written as a single word) is occasionally used interchangeably with trans woman (where trans is an adjective describing a kind of woman). However, this variant is often associated with views (notably gender-critical feminism) that exclude trans women from woman, and thus require a separate word to describe them. For this reason, many transgender people find the spelling offensive. Some prefer to omit trans, and be called simply women.

In several Latin American countries, the word travesti is sometimes used to designate people who have been assigned male sex at birth, but develop a female gender identity. The use of travesti precedes transgender in the region; its distinction from trans woman is controversial and can vary depending on the context, ranging from considering it a regional equivalent to a third gender.

Sexuality

Trans women vary greatly in terms of sexual orientation. A survey of roughly 3000 American trans women showed 31% of them identifying as bisexual, 29% as "gay/lesbian/same-gender", 23% as heterosexual, 7% as asexual, as well as 7% identifying as "queer" and 2% as "other".

In a 2008 study, no statistically significant difference in libido was detected between trans women and cisgender women. As in males, female libido is thought to correlate with serum testosterone levels (with some controversy) but the 2008 study found no such correlation in trans women. Another study, published in 2014, found that 62.4% of trans women reported their sexual desire had decreased after sexual reassignment therapy.

Discrimination

Like all gender variant people, trans women often face discrimination and transphobia, particularly those who are not perceived as cisgender. A 2015 survey from The Williams Institute found that, of 27,715 transgender respondents, 52% whose families had rejected them attempted suicide, as did 64.9% of those who were physically attacked in the past year.

A 2011 survey of roughly 3000 trans women living in the United States, as summarized in the report "Injustice at Every Turn: A Report of the National Transgender Discrimination Survey", found that trans women reported that:
 36% have lost their job due to their gender.
 55% have been discriminated against in hiring.
 29% have been denied a promotion.
 25% have been refused medical care.
 60% of the trans women who have visited a homeless shelter reported incidents of harassment there.
 When displaying identity documents incongruent with their gender identity/expression, 33% have been harassed and 3% have been physically assaulted.
 20% reported harassment by police, with 6% reporting physical assault and 3% reporting sexual assault by an officer. 25% have been treated generally with disrespect by police officers.
 Among jailed trans women, 40% have been harassed by inmates, 38% have been harassed by staff, 21% have been physically assaulted, and 20% have been sexually assaulted.

The American National Coalition of Anti-Violence Programs' report of 2010 anti-LGBTQ violence found that of the 27 people who were murdered because of their LGBTQ identity, 44% were trans women. Discrimination is particularly severe towards non-white trans women, who experience the intersection of racism and transphobia. For example, a potential result of such discrimination is that multiracial, Latina, Black and Indigenous American trans women are twice to more than three times as likely as white trans women to be sexually assaulted in prison.

In her book Whipping Girl, trans woman Julia Serano refers to the unique discrimination trans women experience as "transmisogyny".

Discrimination against trans women has occurred at the Michigan Womyn's Music Festival after the Festival set out a rule that it would only be a space for cisgender females. This led to protests by trans women and their allies, and a boycott of the Festival by Equality Michigan in 2014. The boycott was joined by the Human Rights Campaign, GLAAD, the National Center for Lesbian Rights, and the National LGBTQ Task Force. The "womyn-born-womyn" intention first came to attention in 1991 after a transsexual festival-goer, Nancy Burkholder, was asked to leave the festival when several women recognized her as a trans woman and expressed discomfort with her presence in the space.

Violence towards trans women

Trans women face a form of violence known as trans bashing. The Washington Blade reported that Global Rights, an international NGO, tracked the mistreatment of trans women in Brazil, including at the hands of the police. To commemorate those who have been murdered in hate crimes, an annual Transgender Day of Remembrance is held in various locations across the United States, Canada, Western Europe, Australia, and New Zealand, with details and sources for each murder provided at their website.

United States

According to a 2009 report by the National Coalition of Anti-Violence Programs, quoted by the Office for Victims of Crime, 11% of all hate crimes towards members of the LGBTQ community were directed towards trans women.

In 2015, a false statistic was widely reported in the United States media stating that the life expectancy of a trans woman of color is only 35 years. This appears to be based on a comment specifically about Latin America in a report by the Inter-American Commission on Human Rights, which compiled data on the age at death of murdered trans women for all of the Americas (North, South, and Central), and does not disaggregate by race.

In 2016, 23 transgender people suffered fatal attacks in the United States. The Human Rights Campaign report found some of these deaths to be direct results of an anti-transgender bias, and some due to related factors such as homelessness.

One type of violence towards trans women is committed by perpetrators who learn that their sexual partner is transgender, and feel deceived ("trans panic"). Almost 95% of these crimes were committed by cisgender men towards trans women. According to a 2005 study in Houston, Texas, "50% of transgender people surveyed had been hit by a primary partner after coming out as transgender".

Trans women in the media
Trans representation in television, film, news, and other forms of media was slim before the 21st century. Early mainstream accounts and fictional depictions of trans women almost always relied on common tropes and stereotypes. However, portrayals have steadily grown and improved in tandem with activism. In the movie Discloure: Trans Lives on Screen, director Sam Feder explores Hollywood's history of trans representation and the cultural effects of such depictions. Many notable 21st century trans actresses and celebrities shared their stories in the film, including Laverne Cox, Alexandra Billings, Jamie Clayton, and more.

See also

 Trans man
 Transfeminism
 List of transgender-related topics
 List of transgender people
 Transgender people in sports

References

 
Terms for women
Transgender identities